{{Infobox former subdivision
| native_name            = Примо́рская о́бластьPrimorskaya oblast| conventional_long_name = Primorskaya Oblast
| common_name            = Kamchatka
| subdivision            = Oblast
| nation                 = Russia and Far Eastern Republic
| status_text            = 
| capital                = Nikolayevsk-on-Amur (1856-1880)Khabarovka (1880-1888)Vladivostok (1888-1922)
| latd                   = 
| latm                   = 
| latNS                  = 
| longd                  = 
| longm                  = 
| longEW                 = 
| year_start             = 1856
| year_end               = 1922
| event_start            = 
| date_start             = 31 October
| event_end              = Transformed into Primorskaya Governorate
| date_end               = 
| image_flag             = Flag of Russia.svg
| image_coat             = Coat of Arms of Primorye oblast 1878.svg
| image_map              = Primorska olb1912.png
| flag_type              = 
| flag                   = Flag of Russia
| p1                     = Manchuria under Qing ruleManchuria
| flag_p1                = Flag of China (1889–1912).svg
| s1                     = Primorskaya Governorate
| flag_s1                = Flag of the Far Eastern Republic.svg
| today                  = Russia
| s2                     = Kamchatka Oblast (Russian Empire)
}}Primorskaya Oblast''' was an administrative division of the Russian Empire and the early Russian SFSR, created on October 31, 1856 by the Governing Senate. The name of the region literally means "Maritime" or "Coastal." The region was established upon a Russian conquest of Daur people that used to live along Amur River. Before the Russian conquest, the territory belonged to the Chinese region of Outer Manchuria.

History

The Amur region was raided by the 1651 Russian expedition of Yerofey Khabarov, after which the indigenous Daur people were either killed or fled further into territory of Qing China. Before the Russian conquest, the territory belonged to the Chinese region of Outer Manchuria. The precursor of Primorskaya Oblast was the Albazino Voivodeship that existed 1882-86 and was abolished upon the conclusion of the Sino-Russian border conflicts. At first it was part of the Eastern Siberian General Government, but beginning 1884 within the Cis-Amur General Government.

Originally the oblast included the entire northeastern portion of Russia and territories of the Cis-Amur region. It was organized out of the newly acquired territories of the valley of the River Amur, Kamchatka Oblast, and Sakhalin. In 1858 the territory bordering along the left-bank of the Amur River to the outlet of the Ussuri River was transferred to the newly established Amur Oblast. 

At that time the region only included four districts: Nikolayevsk, Sofiysk, Okhotsk, Kamchatka. According to the Peking Treaty, in 1860 the Ussuri Krai was annexed to the region, based on the Treaty of Aigun and the Convention of Peking. During 1880-1888 there was created a separate Vladivostok Military Governorate that included Muravyov-Amursky Peninsula and the port of Vladivostok. In 1884 Sakhalin was separated as a separate administrative territory.

The capital of the oblast was originally Nikolayevsk-on-Amur, during 1880-1888 – Khabarovka (presently named Khabarovsk), and during 1888 it was relocated to Vladivostok. 

In 1920, Primorskaya Oblast was included in the Far Eastern Republic and in 1922 transformed into the Primorskaya Governorate.  

From 1932-39, there existed a region with the same name that was part of the Far Eastern Krai of the Russian SFSR.

Gallery

See also
 Amur Annexation
 1855 Treaty of Shimoda, Japan-Russia delimitation treaty on Sakhalin and Kurile islands

References
Notes

Sources
"История Советского Приморья" (History of the Soviet Primorye), под ред. А. И. Крушанова (ed. A. I. Krushanov). Дальневосточное книжное издательство. Владивосток, 1976.

External links
 Ilyinykh, V., Sviryukova, V. Primorskaya Oblast''. Historical Encyclopedia of Siberia. 2009.
 Map of the Moscow Tsardom before the 1689 Treaty of Nerchinsk. "History.ru"
 Map of Qing dynasty in 17th century. "History.ru"
 World map of the mid 18th century. "History.ru"
 Map of the Russian Empire in 18th century. "History.ru"

Oblasts of the Russian Empire
States and territories established in 1856